Tassin la Demi-Lune is a commune in Lyon Metropolis in the Auvergne-Rhône-Alpes region of central-eastern France. In 2017, it had a population of 22,297. Its inhabitants are named Tassilunois in French.

Geography
The town of Tassin-la-Demi-Lune is located in the western suburbs of Lyon and is part of Lyon Metropolis.

The city is connected by four train stations: Écully-la-Demi-Lune, Tassin, Alaï and Le Méridien.

Several bus lines connect the city to the metro station Gorge de Loup (Line D): strong lines C21, C24 and C24E, as well as the normal bus lines 14, 72, 73 and 73E, 86 and 98. Line 5 and 55 also connected the city to other metro stations.

Mayors

Demography
In 2018, the city had 22,403 inhabitants.

Notable people
Jérémy Berthod, footballer
Corinne Maîtrejean, foil fencer
Hélène Seuzaret, actress
Woodkid, musician

See also
Communes of the Metropolis of Lyon

References

Communes of Lyon Metropolis
Lyonnais